The Pentagon Formation is a geologic formation in Montana. It preserves fossils dating back to the Cambrian period.

See also

 List of fossiliferous stratigraphic units in Montana
 Paleontology in Montana

References
 

Cambrian Montana
Cambrian southern paleotropical deposits